North American Soccer League (NASL) was a professional soccer league in the United States and Canada that is the 2nd Division of their respective soccer pyramids.

List of coaches by club
The list of coaches includes everyone who has coached a club while they were in the NASL, whether in a permanent or temporary role. Interim coaches are listed only when they managed the team for at least one match in that period.

References

External links

Coaches
 
North American Soccer League